Androtion was an ancient Greek writer on agriculture, who lived before the time of Theophrastus.

Notes

Geoponici
Ancient Greek writers